Braunschweig is an electoral constituency (German: Wahlkreis) represented in the Bundestag. It elects one member via first-past-the-post voting. Under the current constituency numbering system, it is designated as constituency 50. It is located in southeastern Lower Saxony, comprising the city of Braunschweig.

Braunschweig was created for the inaugural 1949 federal election. Since 2021, it has been represented by Christos Pantazis of the Social Democratic Party (SPD).

Geography
Braunschweig is located in southeastern Lower Saxony. As of the 2021 federal election, it comprises the independent city of Braunschweig.

History
Braunschweig was created in 1949, then known as Stadt Braunschweig. It acquired its current name in the 1965 election. In the inaugural Bundestag election, it was Lower Saxony constituency 28 in the numbering system. From 1953 through 1961, it was number 50. From 1965 through 1998, it was number 45. In the 2002 and 2005 elections, it was number 50. In the 2009 election, it was number 51. Since the 2013 election, it has been number 50. Its borders have not changed since its creation.

Members
The constituency was first held by Otto Arnholz of the Social Democratic Party (SPD), who served from 1949 to 1957.  of the Christian Democratic Union (CDU) won in 1957 and served a single term. Walter Schmidt of the SPD then served from 1961 to 1972, followed by Hermann Oetting for a single term. Klaus-Dieter Kühbacher was elected in 1976 and served two terms. In 1983, Joachim Clemens of the CDU was elected representative, and served until 1994. Leyla Onur regained the constituency for the SPD in 1994, and was re-elected in 1998. Carola Reimann won in 2002, and was re-elected in 2005, 2009, 2013, and 2017. She resigned in November 2017 after being appointed to the state government of Lower Saxony. Christos Pantazis of the SPD was elected in 2021.

Election results

2021 election

2017 election

2013 election

2009 election

References

Federal electoral districts in Lower Saxony
Braunschweig
1949 establishments in West Germany
Constituencies established in 1949